Mark Ashworth is an English actor. He is known for his work as Janitor Justin / Shining Knight in the DC Universe series Stargirl.

Early life
Ashworth was born in Eccles, Salford, Great Britain.

Career
In 2016, Ashworth played Preacher in The Magnificent Seven.    In 2019, Ashworth starred in the movies Mine 9 and Along Came the Devil 2.

Filmography

Film

Television

References

External links

Living people
Year of birth missing (living people)